is a Japanese footballer who is a forward for Tokushima Vortis.

Club career
Sugimori made his official debut for Nagoya Grampus in the J1 League, J.League Cup on 19 March 2014 against Ventforet Kofu in Mizuho Athletic Stadium in Nagoya, Japan. He subbed in the match in the 84th minute replacing Riki Matsuda. Sugimori and his club lost the match 1-0.

National team career
In October 2013, Sugimori was elected Japan U-17 national team for 2013 U-17 World Cup. He played 2 matches.

Club statistics

References

External links 

Profile at FC Machida Zelvia
Profile at Nagoya Grampus
 

1995 births
Living people
Association football people from Aichi Prefecture
Japanese footballers
J1 League players
J2 League players
J3 League players
Nagoya Grampus players
FC Machida Zelvia players
Tokushima Vortis players
J.League U-22 Selection players
Association football forwards